M-11 highway (previously known as M-2.1) is a Montenegrin roadway.

The M-11 highway serves as an extension of the M-1 highway, serving Tivat and Tivat Airport. When used with Ferryboat to Kamenari it also serves as a shortcut for M-1 highway bypassing much of bay of Kotor.

It is the shortest highway in Montenegro.

History
Before Vrmac Tunnel was built, M-11 highway was part of M-2 highway, which itself was part of Adriatic highway also serving as part of  International E-roads. On 27 March 2014, the Ministry of Transport and Maritime Affairs realigned the M-2 highway. Regional road R-22 was declared defunct and its route integrated into the M-2. As a result of the realignment, the M-2 no longer served the Tivat Municipality. Instead, the Vrmac Peninsula (and thus the Tivat Municipality) was bypassed via the Vrmac Tunnel, connecting Radanovići to Kotor. The pre-realignment route from Radanovići and Lepetani (Ferryboat) was reassigned as the M-2.1 highway, while the remaining route between Lepetani and Škaljari was downgraded to a municipal road.

In January 2016, the Ministry of Transport and Maritime Affairs published bylaw on categorisation of state roads. With new categorisation, M-11 highway was created from previous M-2.1 highway.

Major intersections

References

M-11